ʿAdān (Arabic: العدان, Gulf Arabic pronunciation: il-ʿAdān) is a residential area in the Mubarak Al-Kabeer Governorate in Kuwait, located approximately 18 kilometres (≈ 11 miles) from the centre of Kuwait City.

Districts of Mubarak Al-Kabeer Governorate
Suburbs of Kuwait City